Geoffrey Broadbent (born 11 June 1929) is an English architect, academic and professor emeritus, and a prolific author in architectural theory, especially semiotics. He is professor emeritus at the School of Architecture at the University of Portsmouth, England. Among his best known works are the books Design in Architecture: Architecture and the Human Sciences (1973) and Emerging Concepts in Urban Space Design (1990). He was born in Huddersfield.

Biography

Family, education and career 
Broadbent was born on 11 June 1929 in Huddersfield, Yorkshire, England, son of Albert and Florence Broadbent. He studied architecture at the University of Manchester, completing his studies in 1955. He worked as an assistant architect at the architects firm of Fairhursts in Manchester in 1956-1959. His interests, however, lay more in academia; he was a lecturer in architecture at the University of Manchester in 1959-1961; lecturer at the Institute of Advanced Architectural Studies (IAAS) at the University of York in 1961-1962; and lecturer at the University of Sheffield in 1963-1967, before being made head of the School Architecture at Portsmouth Polytechnic in 1967, a position he held until 1994, when he became professor emeritus. Among the numerous positions he has held over his career, he was chairman of the Portsmouth Society in 1974-1988, a member of numerous committees (especially tied to education) in the Royal Institute of British Architects, the Royal Society of Arts, the Design Research Society, and the British School at Rome.

Geoffrey Broadbent was married to Anne Barbara Broadbent (deceased 1985), and they had two children, Mark John Broadbent and Antony James Broadbent. He married Gloria Camino Maldonado in 1991.

Work
Broadbent was one of a number of early theorists in architectural theory, along with others such as Christopher Alexander, who made strong links between architecture and the humanities and psychology and later, along with others such as Charles Jencks, in semiotics. His seminal book Design in Architecture: Architecture and the Human Sciences (1973) attempted to break down the architectural design process into its constituent parts. He posited four major phases in design activity; pragmatic, iconic, analogic and canonic. Reviewing the book in 1980, Bryan Lawson called it "essential reading for those interested in a kind of environmental design where, above all, people matter."

Published books 
Design in Architecture. Architecture and the Human Sciences, London: John Wiley and Sons Inc., 1973.
Neo-classicism: Schinkel, Johnson, Stirling, AD profile 23, Vol. 49, No 8-9, London: Academy Press, 1979.
Meaning and Behaviour in the Built Environment, London: John Wiley, 1980
Signs, Symbols and Architecture (with Richard Bunt and Charles Jencks), London: John Wiley & Sons Inc., 1980.
Emerging Concepts in Urban Space Design, Brussels: Van Nostrand Reinhold, 1990.
Tomás Taveira, London: John Wiley & Sons, 1991.
Deconstruction: A Student Guide, London: Academy Press, 1991.

References 

1929 births
Possibly living people
People from Huddersfield
Semioticians
Architects from Yorkshire
Architectural theoreticians
Alumni of the University of Manchester
Academics of the University of Portsmouth
British architecture writers